425 Market Street is an office skyscraper located on the corner of Market and Fremont Streets in the financial district of San Francisco, California. The , 38 floor office tower was completed in 1973. It was built by the Metropolitan Life Insurance Company as their "Pacific Coast Headquarters" and was called "1 Metropolitan Plaza". It was built as a modern replacement for their older headquarters on Nob Hill at 600 Stockton Street (now remodeled as the Ritz-Carlton Hotel). It was among the first buildings in San Francisco to have a high-speed transport system (a glorified dumb waiter) for computer data cards, files and inner-office mail, at the time a state-of-the-art system.

Its largest tenant today is law firm Morrison & Foerster LLP. The building is partially owned by the Government Pension Fund of Norway, who according to their 2015 report owns 47.5%.

See also

 San Francisco's tallest buildings

References

External links
 425 Market Street official website
 425 Market Street Tenant Handbook

Skyscraper office buildings in San Francisco
Market Street (San Francisco)
Office buildings completed in 1973
Financial District, San Francisco
Skidmore, Owings & Merrill buildings
Leadership in Energy and Environmental Design gold certified buildings